The 2013 Football League Trophy Final was the 30th final of the English domestic football cup competition for teams from Football Leagues One and Two, the Football League Trophy. The final was played at Wembley Stadium in London on 7 April 2013. The match was contested between Crewe Alexandra from League One and Southend United from League Two. Crewe Alexandra won the game 2–0, following goals from Luke Murphy and Max Clayton.

Match

Statistics

2013
Events at Wembley Stadium
Crewe Alexandra F.C. matches
Southend United F.C. matches
2013 sports events in London
2012–13 Football League